Nadezhda Neynsky, previously known as Nadezhda Nikolova Mihaylova (born 9 August 1962 in Sofia) is a Bulgarian politician. In the past, she was Minister of Foreign Affairs (1997–2001), head of Union of Democratic Forces (March 2002 – October 2005) and Member of the Bulgarian Parliament (37th, 38th, 39th and 40th National Assembly of Bulgaria). Since 2009, she has been a Member of the European Parliament.

Early life and education 

In 1977, Mihaylova completed her primary education at the 127th "Ivan Denkoglu" school in Sofia and in 1981 graduated from the Lycée Français de Sofia. Mihaylova subsequently enrolled as a student of philology at Sofia University, completing her studies in 1985. Between 1986 and 1988, she worked as a freelance journalist. In that period Mihaylova became a member of the Union of Translators in Bulgaria (Bulgarian: Съюз на преводачите в България).

Career

Member of the Bulgarian National Assembly and foreign minister of Bulgaria
Nadezhda Mihaylova was a member of the Union of Democratic Forces (SDS) until she left in November 2012 after 21 years of membership in the party.

She was elected to sit the 37th National Assembly (1995–1997). During this time she sat on the Foreign Affairs Committee and was member of the Bulgarian delegation to the Council of Europe. She was also chairman of the Committee for Parliamentary and Public Relations Assembly (1994–1997). 
During this time she was also vice-President of the Union of Democratic Forces.

She was reelected in 1997 and sat in the 38th National Assembly (1997–2001). She was appointed Minister of Foreign Affairs in Ivan Kostov's government and held that post for four years. As Minister of Foreign Affairs, she strongly supported a policy of NATO integration and EU membership of her country.

In February 1999, she was chosen as the deputy chairman of the European People's Party at the 13th Congress in Brussels, becoming the first person from Eastern Europe to hold this position.

In March 2000, as Bulgarian Foreign Minister, Mihaylova denied having delivered a document showing an alleged plan of former Serbian president Slobodan Milosevic aimed at ethnic cleansing of Kosovo (Operation Horseshoe) to the then foreign minister of Germany, Joschka Fischer, in April 1999. In 2012, however, Mihaylova finally admitted to private Bulgarian channel BTV that she had handed the document regards Operation Horseshoe to the German foreign minister. During the 78-day NATO bombing of Yugoslavia, in April 1999, British Prime Minister Tony Blair travelled to Sofia praising Nadezhda Mihaylova commitment with the words: "You, Nadezhda, have become the symbol of the wider Europe – of a whole Europe – a Europe of solidarity."

As an MP in the 39th National Assembly (2001–2005), she was a member of the Foreign Affairs Committee and the Committee on National Security and Defence.

She was elected chairman of the United Democratic Forces in 2002. After the disappointing local elections of 2003, a rift broke between her and former PM Ivan Kostov in the party. In 2004 29 UDF delegates (led by Kostov) left to form a new party, Democrats for a Strong Bulgaria. After the disappointing 2005 parliamentary election, with her party finishing fifth, she was succeeded by former president Petar Stoyanov as chairman of the party. On 30 November 2005, Mihaylova established the "Right Alternative" (Bulgarian: Дясна алтернатива) faction within the party.

As an MP in the 40th National Assembly, she was a member of the Foreign Affairs Committee, and the Committee on European Integration (2005–2009). Nadezhda was also vice-President of the National Assembly of Bulgaria from 2008–2009.

In November 2012, she quit the right-wing party after three senior MPs were expelled.

Member of the European Parliament 
In the 2009 European parliamentary election Neynsky was elected as SDS candidate. Since then she has been a member of the European People's Party (Bulgarian: Hristyandemokrati). As an MEP she sat on the Committee on Budgets and was co Resident on Common Foreign and Security Policy (CFSP). She was also a member of the Delegation to the EU-Russia and a member of the Delegation for relations with the NATO Parliamentary Assembly. She served as a Deputy on the Committee on Foreign Affairs, a Deputy on the Subcommittee on Security and Defence and a substitute member of the Delegation for relations with Maghreb countries and the Arab Maghreb Union.

In May 2012, she founded, together with the Austrian MEP Paul Rübig and the Danish MEP Bendt Bendtsen, a new organization called SME Europe. This pro-business organization within the European People's Party, aims at improving the situation of small and medium-sized enterprises all across Europe. Currently, she holds the position of President. She was vice-President of the Union of SMEs to the European People's Party from 2007 to 2011 and vice-President of the European People's Party.

Other fields of politics 
When talking in 2016 with a newspaper about a role model as a leader, she revealed her admiration for former US Secretary of State, Madeleine Albright.

Currently Nadezhda Neynski is the Ambassador of Bulgaria to Turkey.

Outside politics 
She was chairman of the Board of the Association of Small and Medium Enterprises in Bulgaria in 2007. She was also a member of the Advisory Group of the Southern Leaders' Round Tables (SLRT) to the Special Branch Cooperation among Developing Countries (Special Unit for South-South Cooperation) in 2006. She is a member of the International Advisory Committee to the "Democracy Coalition Project", in partnership with the Foundation "Bertelsmann", organization "Freedom House" and the Ghana Centre for Democratic Development (2006). President of the Institute for Democracy and Stability in Southeast Europe (2004).
 
She became a member of the National Union of Civil Society UNITY of 8 December 2012.

Awards 
She received the Golden Plate award of the Academy of Achievement, Order of Denmark, first degree awarded Medal of the Republic of Malta, Venice Honour, Knight of the Legion of Honor, France Cross of the Order of public office by the King of Spain, awarded the Medal of tolerance organization B'nai B'rith.

Mihaylova was also chosen as the woman politician of the year in Bulgaria for 2008.

Family 
In 1983 Nadezhda married Kamen Mikhailov and they have two daughters - Violeta and Nina. In 2006, Nadezhda and Kamen divorced. On 3 October 2009,Nadezhda Mihaylova married Svetlin Neynski at the Embassy of Bulgaria in Madrid.

See also
 Operation Horseshoe

 List of foreign ministers in 2001 
 Foreign relations of Bulgaria
 List of Bulgarians

Notes

References

Bibliography

External links 
 
Nadezhda Mihaylova - breaching the Schengen Wall, esiweb.org

1962 births
Living people
Women government ministers of Bulgaria
Women MEPs for Bulgaria
Foreign ministers of Bulgaria
Government ministers of Bulgaria
Members of the National Assembly (Bulgaria)
MEPs for Bulgaria 2009–2014
Union of Democratic Forces (Bulgaria) MEPs
Union of Democratic Forces (Bulgaria) politicians
Sofia University alumni
Female foreign ministers
Bulgarian women diplomats